Chandili is a census town in Rayagada district  in the state of Odisha, India.

Demographics
 India census, Chandili had a population of 18,688. Males constitute 51% of the population and females 49%. Chandili has an average literacy rate of 66%, higher than the national average of 59.5%; with male literacy of 74% and female literacy of 56%. 12% of the population is under 6 years of age.

References

Cities and towns in Rayagada district